OVI may refer to:

 Ohio Volunteer Infantry, volunteer regiment during the American Civil War
 Operating a Vehicle under the Influence (of alcohol and/or drugs)
 Optically Variable Ink, anti-counterfeiting measure in currency
 Open Verilog International, now Accellera
 Operator of Vital Importance, or Opérateur d'Importance Vitale, in France.

Ovi may refer to:

 Ovi (Nokia), former brand for Nokia's Internet services
 Ovi Magazine, an online magazine based in Helsinki, Finland
 Ovi (poetry), an Indian poetic metre. Poems in this meter are also called ovi
 Ovi (music), a form of wedding music predominantly seen among the Hindu and Catholic community in Goa, India
 Alexander Ovechkin (b. 1985), Russian hockey player
 Ovidiu Cernăuţeanu (b. 1974), Romanian singer
 Ovi, Hungarian slang for Kindergarten

See also